Double Happiness is a 1994 Canadian drama film directed by Mina Shum, co-produced by the National Film Board of Canada. The film stars Sandra Oh as Jade Li, an actress struggling to assert her independence from the expectations of her Chinese Canadian family. Callum Keith Rennie also stars as Mark, Jade's love interest.

It was one of Oh's earliest performances; she received critical acclaim for her performance, and won the Genie Award for Best Performance by an Actress in a Leading Role for the film.

Plot
Jade Li (Sandra Oh) is a feisty Chinese-Canadian aspiring actress who lives at home with her traditional Chinese family: her strict father (Stephen Chang), her dutiful mother (Alannah Ong), and her sweet younger sister, Pearl (Frances You). Their older brother, Winston, has been disowned—a fate Jade is not eager to share, both for her own sake and to spare her family pain.

Her family tries to put on the perfect public persona at all costs so as to maintain their dignity as well as uphold their traditional Chinese values. One primary part of this persona is prosperity. Jade's father hopes that true financial prosperity will become reality through penny stocks. Jade, meanwhile, tries to achieve that happy medium between giving in to her parents' wishes and fulfilling her own needs and desires - double happiness. Therefore, although she manages to land a few bit parts on camera, Jade spends most of her time working in the shop owned by a family friend, performing the duties of a respectful daughter and suffering through arranged dates with prosperous young Chinese men (Including one who is gay). An adept cultural chameleon, though, she also leads a double life, hanging out with best friend Lisa (Claudette Carracedo).

When her father's childhood friend arrives for a visit, Jade must juggle her competing identities even more carefully than usual, lest her choice of professions—and boyfriends—shame her father. Because of its instability, Jade's parents don't understand or widely publicize Jade's aspirations to be an actress. Their main want for Jade is to date and marry a nice Chinese boy, a goal for which Jade's extended family also strives as they are always trying to introduce her to Chinese boys. Initially, they believe that the boy is Andrew, with who Jade even agrees to go out. But Jade, beyond wanting to be an actress, wishes her family had more western sensibilities. She is attracted to a slightly awkward but persistent Caucasian English graduate student named Mark. Jade has to figure out how to both please her family, who would not approve of her dating a Caucasian, and be true to herself. Her older brother is already out of the picture for that very reason. Naturally, something must give sooner or later, and the facade of the perfect Chinese daughter soon begins to crumble.

Cast

Awards and nominations

References

External links
 

 

1994 films
English-language Canadian films
1990s English-language films
1990s Cantonese-language films
Canadian drama films
National Film Board of Canada films
Films shot in Vancouver
Films set in Vancouver
Films about interracial romance
Films directed by Mina Shum
Canadian Film Centre films
1994 multilingual films
Canadian multilingual films
1990s Canadian films
Films about Chinese Canadians